The following lists events that happened during 1915 in the Ottoman Empire.

Incumbents
Sultan: Mehmed V
Grand Vizier: Said Halim Pasha

Events

April
 April 24 - The deportation of Armenian notables from Constantinople, beginning the Armenian genocide.
 April 25 - Start of the Gallipoli campaign; Landing at Anzac Cove by Australian and New Zealand Army Corps and landing at Cape Helles by British and French troops to begin the Allied invasion of the Gallipoli peninsula in the Ottoman Empire.

References

 
Years of the 20th century in the Ottoman Empire
1910s in the Ottoman Empire
Ottoman Empire
Ottoman Empire
Ottoman Empire